The Primera A 2006 season (officially "Torneo Primera A 2006") started on April 8, 2006. On October 4, 2006 Chepo F.C. beat 2-1 Pan de Azúcar and was promoted to the ANAPROF while Atalanta was relegated to Copa Rommel Fernández. Policía Nacional was relegated from ANAPROF and Paraiso F.C. was promoted from the Copa Rommel Fernández

After the end of the season Ateltico Guadalupe ceased to exist after financial problem, and since the league only counted with 7 teams instead of the 8 required to play a season, the 2007 season was canceled.

Primera A 2006 teams

Primera A 2006 Standings

Green indicates qualified teams for the final round
Red indicates relegation

Results table

[*] Numerical result unknown, however it is known that the game ended in a tie
[**] Result also reported 3-1
[***] Result also reported 3-1
[****] Result also reported 0-0

Final round

Green indicates teams playing a final game for promotion
Round 6 games were not played due to irrelevance

Final

References
http://www.rsssf.com/tablesp/panama06.html

2006
2
2005–06 in Central American second tier football leagues
2
2006–07 in Central American second tier football leagues